The Caper of the Golden Bulls, also known as Carnival of Thieves, is a 1967 American action comedy film directed by Russell Rouse and starring Stephen Boyd, Yvette Mimieux and Giovanna Ralli.

Plot
During a bombing mission to Germany, wartime pilot Peter Churchman (Boyd) inadvertently destroys a French cathedral. To atone, after the war, Churchman and a crew of accomplices rob a number of banks, making sure the money goes to have the cathedral rebuilt.

Churchman moves to Spain, where he opens a successful restaurant. He and another American expatriate, Grace Harvey (Mimieux), are in a romantic relationship. Life is idyllic until one day Angela Tresler (Ralli), an acquaintance from the war, turns up threatening to expose Churchman's illegal activity unless he and his crew pull off a daring robbery for her in Pamplona.

During the fiesta, Churchman's men carry concealed explosives and tools during the famed Running of the Bulls, veering off into an alley during the event. Churchman has broken into a bank and, using the dynamite, he blows open a safe, timing the explosion with a cannon's shot that is a traditional rite during the festival.

Inside the safe are rare jewels, which he hides inside a precious religious statue. Churchman turns over the statue to Angela, who is elated until she discovers the statue to be empty. Both have been outsmarted by Grace, who replaced the statue with a replica and turned over the jewels safely to Gonzalez, the town's chief of police.

Cast
Stephen Boyd as Peter Churchman
Yvette Mimieux as Grace Harvey
Giovanna Ralli as Angela Tresler
Vito Scotti as Francois Morel
J.G. Devlin as The Tinker
Arnold Moss as Mr. Shanari 
Walter Slezak as Antonio Gonzalez
Clifton James as	Philippe
Jay Novello as Carlos
Henry Beckman as Bendell
Noah Keen as The Irishman
Leon Askin as Morchek

Production
The film had location shooting in Pamplona and Madrid in Spain.

See also
List of American films of 1967

References

External links

1967 films
1960s action comedy films
American action comedy films
American crime comedy films
American heist films
Films based on American novels
Films directed by Russell Rouse
Films scored by Vic Mizzy
Films set in Spain
Embassy Pictures films
1967 comedy films
1960s English-language films
1960s American films